The Rolls-Royce Corniche V is a large, high end, two-door, four-seater luxury convertible car, that was made in the United Kingdom from late 1999, for the model years 2000 to 2002.

Its debut in January 2000 made it Rolls-Royce's first new model in the 21st century, and just the second new model generation to bear the Corniche name, after four consecutive Corniche series derived from the Rolls-Royce Silver Shadow. Contrary to all its predecessors, this Corniche was also the first Rolls-Royce with a soft-top that folds into the car's body.

Nevertheless, despite all-new sheetmetal, bearing a strong resemblance to the Silver Seraph, it had instead been derived from the pre-BMW era Bentley Azure, thus continuing the use of the traditional Rolls-Royce 6.75L V8 engine-block, in common with its predecessors, albeit significantly modernised, and with much better performance, thanks to the Bentley-inherited turbocharger — thus being the first Corniche to have this feature standard.

Released after a five-year hiatus, this fifth series Corniche was Rolls-Royce's most expensive model and flagship car, with a base price of US$359,900. From 2003, Rolls-Royce motor car production was handed over to BMW, who did not prolong the production of any of the existing models, but instead reintroduced the brand with an all-new Phantom VII, costing $300,000 in 2003, even when Pound Sterling was stronger to the US dollar and the dollar was weaker to US consumer prices. Or, in 2003, the all-new model Bentley Continental GT 6L W12 twin-turbo costed just $150,000. Though when the Bentley Continental T model was new 4 years earlier, it seems to have costed $390,000 even in stronger dollars. Aston Martin DB7 MSRP in year 2000 was $143,000.

The Corniche V is the only Rolls-Royce model launched under Volkswagen holding ownership; the last Rolls-Royce Corniche to date, and with just 384 units built, it remains one of the brand's most exclusive modern series production models.

Overview

Performance 
The Rolls-Royce Corniche V is powered by a 325 hp (240 kW) 6.75 L turbocharged Rolls-Royce V8. The Corniche's engine is capable of providing 738 N·m (544 lb·ft) of torque between 2,100-2,300 rpm. The car is operated via a four-speed automatic transmission. It has a top speed of 135 mph (220 km/h) and a 0-60 mph (96 km/h) acceleration time of 8 seconds. The convertible, weighing 6,031 lb (2,736 kg), was built more for comfort than for speed.

Features 
The Corniche V came outfitted with every luxury and refinement characteristic of a Rolls-Royce. 

The interior has Connolly Leather interior, Wilton wool carpets, lambswool rugs, chrome gauges and a wide choice of exotic wood trims applied to the dashboard, console & waistrails, Dual automatic temperature control, powered adjustable front seats, 2 stage heated seats (front and rear), 4 x 30 watt stereo, tuner, cassette and CD system with six CD changer unit mounted in the front seat armrest with eight speaker system. The exterior has a powered retractable soft top, automatic dual-headlamps with chrome surrounds, powered boot mechanism, 17" Alloy wheels, automatic ride control and Electronic Traction Assistance System (ETAS). 

Styling cues were taken from the Rolls-Royce Silver Seraph sedan, but it shares little mechanically with that BMW-engined car. Instead, the Corniche's V body was set onto the older platform used for the Bentley Azure, the Rolls-Royce SZ platform. Making it the first and only Rolls-Royce developed from a Bentley rather than the other way around, (not withstanding the fact that the Bentley Azure was developed on a Rolls-Royce platform to begin with.)

The Corniche V was the only new Rolls-Royce developed under Volkswagen's ownership, before the marque was sold in 2003. All Corniches were completely hand-built. The car was considered a slightly softer, much more exclusive version of the Azure.

Corniche V "Final Series" 
Towards the end of production of the Corniche V, a limited run of 56 "Final Series" cars was planned, 56 being the years in which Rolls-Royce were built at Crewe. Ultimately, only 45 were made out of the original expected 56. They are distinguished by, but not limited to the following: 

 Front-fender badges reading “Rolls-Royce Cars, Crewe, England,” with a Union Jack insignia 
 Chromed mirror housings 
 Restyled & chromed Bentley Azure wheels 
 Spirit of Ecstasy Hubcaps 
 Red Rolls-Royce badges on the grille and trunk lid 
 Rosewood Burr & Cherry Wood trim with Spirit of Ecstasy inlay 
 Individually numbered commemorative plaque on the centre console (out of 56)

Final Rolls-Royce Corniche V 

The last Rolls-Royce Corniche (Chassis 2079) was manufactured on 30 August 2002. Along with most features from the "Final Series" specification, It also had a Unique seat style: A Chesterfield buttoned theme in Spruce Green without seat edge piping, different centre console plaque reading "A Century of Excellence" with the RR logo, and the cities where Rolls-Royces were produced from 1904 to 2002 (in place of the numbered commemorative plaque), silver text inlays on the radio flap reading "The Final Rolls-Royce Corniche Chassis 2079" & treadplates, reading "The Final Rolls-Royce Corniche Chassis 2079 Rolls-Royce Motor Cars, Crewe, England 1946-2002". This was the last Rolls-Royce to be made at the Crewe plant before it was turned over entirely to the production of Bentley models. It was under Rolls-Royce's possession until September 2018 when it was auctioned off by Bonhams.  Only 384 Rolls-Royce Corniche V were ever built.

*stated by Pininfarina production records
**From 2 varying documents, newer data used

See also
 Rolls-Royce Corniche

References

External links

Rolls-Royce Corniche (2000–2002)
2000 Rolls-Royce Corniche review

Corniche
Cars introduced in 2000
Convertibles
Flagship vehicles